Walter Freeman may refer to:

Wally Freeman (athlete) (Walter Freeman, 1893–1987), British Olympic athlete
Walter Jackson Freeman II (1895–1972), American physician, lobotomy specialist
Walter Jackson Freeman III (1927–2016), American biologist, theoretical neuroscientist and philosopher
Walter Freeman (footballer) (1887–?), English professional footballer